"Need You Bad" is a song written and recorded by the American hard rock musician Ted Nugent from his fourth studio album Weekend Warriors.  Charlie Huhn handles the lead vocals.

Chart positions

1978 songs
Ted Nugent songs
Songs written by Ted Nugent
1978 singles
American hard rock songs